The selection of the Democratic Party's vice presidential candidate for the 1964 United States presidential election occurred at the party's national convention and resulted in the selection of Hubert Humphrey to join the ticket with President Lyndon Johnson, who was running for election to a full term.

Background
After the assassination of President John F. Kennedy in 1963, Vice President Lyndon B. Johnson ascended to the presidency. As the 25th Amendment had not yet been passed, there was no process for filling the office of vice president until the next post-election inauguration, and Speaker of the House John William McCormack was next-in-line for the presidency from November 1963 to January 1965. Johnson carefully considered his running mate for the 1964 election, and put up "trial balloons" in the media.

Speculation
Those who were the subject of speculation included Humphrey, who was a key lieutenant for Johnson in the Senate, particularly in regards to the 1964 Civil Rights Act. Others included Connecticut Senators Abraham Ribicoff and Thomas J. Dodd, Secretary of Defense Robert McNamara, New York Mayor Robert Wagner, California Governor Pat Brown, and Minnesota Senator Eugene McCarthy. Many Democrats also hoped for Attorney General Robert F. Kennedy, the brother of former President John F. Kennedy, but Johnson carefully maneuvered to keep Kennedy off the ticket due to personal enmity between the two.

Selection
As the convention got underway, a potential issue was that there were competing delegations from Mississippi. The Mississippi Freedom Democratic Party, which included black and white members opposed to racial segregation, challenged the delegate credentials of Mississippi Democratic Party members who favored segregation. Johnson wanted no disruptions to distract from his nomination, and he assigned Humphrey to solve the problem. Humphrey worked with Walter Mondale to craft a compromise which satisfied Johnson.

On August 27, Humphrey met with Johnson in the Oval Office. In their discussion, they agreed that if Humphrey joined the ticket and Johnson and Humphrey won the general election, Humphrey would have important executive branch responsibilities, including oversight of the administration's nuclear disarmament, antipoverty, and space programs. In addition, they agreed that Humphrey would have a high profile role in Johnson's foreign policy. After this interview, Johnson announced his choice of Humphrey for the vice presidential nomination.

Humphrey easily won the vice presidential nomination on the first ballot at the 1964 Democratic National Convention. The Johnson–Humphrey ticket went on to beat the Goldwater–Miller ticket in the 1964 election.

Potential running mates

Finalists
Minnesota Senator Hubert Humphrey
Minnesota Senator Eugene McCarthy
Connecticut Senator Thomas J. Dodd

Others
California Governor Pat Brown
Connecticut Senator Abraham A. Ribicoff
New York Mayor Robert Wagner
Secretary of Agriculture Orville Freeman
Attorney General Robert F. Kennedy
U.N. Ambassador, former Governor of Illinois, and '52/'56 Democratic Presidential nominee Adlai E. Stevenson II
Senate Majority Leader Mike Mansfield of Montana
OEO Director Sargent Shriver
Secretary of Defense Robert McNamara

See also
1964 Democratic National Convention
1964 Democratic Party presidential primaries

References

Vice presidency of the United States
1964 United States presidential election
Lyndon B. Johnson
Hubert Humphrey
Robert F. Kennedy